Al-Mansi (also called 'Arab Baniha ) was a Palestinian village in the Haifa Subdistrict. It was occupied on 12 April 1948 by Israeli troops during the Battle of Mishmar HaEmek.

Geography
Al-Mansi is located on the western side of Marj Ibn 'Amer (Jezreel Valley), and is 30 km southeast of Haifa city. It is situated at an elevation of 125 meters above sea level. The total land area is (12,272 Dunums;12,272,000 m²)

History
In 1882  the PEF's Survey of Western Palestine described it as "a small ruined village, with springs."

British Mandate era
In the 1922 census of Palestine conducted by the British Mandate authorities, Al-Mansi had a population 72; 68 Muslims and 4 Christians, where the Christians were Roman Catholics.  This had increased in the 1931 census   to 467; 461 Muslims and 6 Christians, in a total of 98 houses.

In the 1945 statistics, al-Mansi  had 292 houses, most constructed from stone.  It had one elementary school, a mosque and a mill. The land used to be planted with olives, cereals and vegetable. Al-Mansi had six springs in its vicinity which supplied it with drinking water. In 1945, it had a population of 1,200 inhabitants; 1,180 Muslims and 20 Christians,  and the total land area was 12,272 dunams. Of the land, Arabs used 1,391 dunams for plantations and irrigable land, 6,559 for grains, while 17 dunams were built-up (urban) areas.

1948 War and aftermath
On 9 April 1948,  Golani troops informed their headquarter that "Our forces are fighting in …Mansi.. We are preparing to destroy the villages when we evacuate them."  The newspaper Filastin reported that Zionist forces had infiltrated al-Mansi on 9 April, resulting in an exchange of fire with the village's defenders.

According to  Fawzi al-Qawuqji, the Arab Liberation Army forces withdrew to al-Mansi on 11 April, after a "violent" counter-attack.

On 12 April, al-Mansi and other villages in its vicinity were attacked  by Haganah  troops, and their inhabitants  evacuated, and its inhabitants became refugees, most of them currently living in the Palestinian refugee camps, or in Jordan, Syria, Germany and the United States.  The following days, the buildings of al-Mansi were blown up by Haganah.

Following the war the area was incorporated into the State of Israel. The kibbutz of Midrakh Oz was built close to the village site in 1952, and uses part of the village's former lands. The Palestinian historian Walid Khalidi described the village in 1992: "The remains of the school and the mosque are still standing in the midst of a thick undergrowth composed of vines and thorny bushes. The exposed foundations of the village buildings, surrounded by stone rubble, can be seen throughout the site. The agricultural kibbutz of Midrakh Oz occupies part of the adjacent land. The rest is used for growing avocado trees and raising poultry and cattle."

Some of the people of al-Mansi in Jordan formed a social club in Amman called Diwan al-Mansi, and in 2005 a book on al-Mansi was published.

References

Bibliography

 

al-Qawuqji, F. (1972): Memoirs  of al-Qawuqji, Fauzi in Journal of Palestine Studies
"Memoirs, 1948, Part I" in 1, no. 4 (Sum. 72): 27-58., dpf-file, downloadable
"Memoirs, 1948, Part II" in 2, no. 1 (Aut. 72): 3-33., dpf-file, downloadable

External links
 Welcome to al-Mansi Palestine Remembered.
al-Mansi, Zochrot
Survey of Western Palestine, Map 8:  IAA, Wikimedia commons 
 Al-Mansi photos from Dr. Moslih Kanaaneh
al-Mansi from the Khalil Sakakini Cultural Center
 Al-Jazeera.

Arab villages depopulated prior to the 1948 Arab–Israeli War
District of Haifa